The 1st constituency of Csongrád-Csanád County is one of the single member constituencies of the National Assembly, the national legislature of Hungary. The constituency standard abbreviation: Csongrád-Csanád 01. OEVK.

Since 2014, it has been represented by Sándor Szabó of the MSZP party.

Geography
The 1st constituency is located in southern part of Csongrád-Csanád County.

List of municipalities
The constituency includes the following municipalities:

Members
The constituency was first represented by Sándor Szabó of MSZP (with Unity support) from 2014, and he was re-elected in 2018 and 2022 (with United for Hungary support).

Notes

References

Csongrád-Csanád 1st